"Yo También" (English: "Me Too") is a song written and performed by Bachata singer Romeo Santos featuring Salsa singer Marc Anthony Released as the fifth single for his second studio album Formula, Vol. 2 (2014). The music video was released on January 23, 2015. It features Santos, an FBI agent who is going after Anthony, the loyal member of a mafia, fighting for the same girl (portrayed by Russian model Irina Shayk) they're in love with as they debate over either of whom made her happier. Dominican actor Manny Pérez also appears as Santos' superior.

Charts

Weekly charts

Year-end charts

Certifications

See also
List of Billboard Hot Latin Songs and Latin Airplay number ones of 2014

References

2014 songs
2014 singles
Salsa songs
Romeo Santos songs
Marc Anthony songs
Songs written by Romeo Santos
Spanish-language songs
Sony Music Latin singles
Male vocal duets